Mandekan may refer to:

 Mande languages
 Mandakan, a village in Iran